Bugs Bunny Gets the Boid is a 1942 Merrie Melodies cartoon, directed by Bob Clampett, produced by Leon Schlesinger, and released to theatres by Warner Bros. Pictures. It marks the first appearance of Beaky Buzzard in a Warner Bros. short.

The title is a Brooklyn-accented way of saying "gets the bird", which can refer to an obscene gesture, or as simply the "Bronx cheer"; in this case, it is also used metaphorically, as Bugs "gets" the bird (a buzzard) by playing a trick.

Plot
The cartoon begins with a mother buzzard instructing her children to go out and catch something for dinner. Three of them take off like jets from an aircraft carrier. One stays behind, his back turned. This is Beaky Buzzard (Killer) who is shy, easily embarrassed, and a little on the slow side. Against his will, his mother kicks him out of the nest with instructions to at least catch a rabbit. Beaky spots Bugs Bunny and, after sneaking around some clouds 'stalking' his prey, soars down to catch him. Bugs makes like an air-traffic controller and "guides" Beaky down, purposely causing him to crash.

Beaky then passes out while landing on the ground, unable to move or speak. Bugs rises out of his hole and says his catchphrase, "What's up, doc?" Beaky then says, to the tune of Blues in the Night, "My mama done told me, bring home something for dinner." Bugs asks Beaky what he is having for dinner, then Beaky grabs Bugs' shoulders and says, "It's a rabbit." Bugs agrees to come along as soon as he “tidies up” and heads back into his rabbit hole to have a shower. Beaky stares at the Fourth wall when he says the line, "I think he's-a-tricking me." Then Beaky pulls Bugs out of his rabbit hole. Bugs, (disguised as a girl) then pops out of his rabbit hole and says, "You naughty naughty boy." in a feminine voice. As a result, Beaky goes all gibberish and embarrassed with a red face going, "Oh no no, oh no." Bugs then proceeds to smack Beaky's bottom with the towel wrapped around him, then as soon as Beaky reaches the ground, Bugs hides behind the rocks. Beaky comes looking for Bugs when he suddenly jumps out from behind the rocks and fiddles with his Adam's Apple to try and annoy him.

After some heckling and trickery from Bugs, a chase ensues. Beaky manages to grab Bugs in his talons and swoops away.  Bugs tickles the buzzard with one of his own tail feathers, resulting in Bugs being released and falling.  There is the skeleton of a dead animal resting on the ground and, as Bugs' bottom half is actually driven into the earth, he disturbs the bones and the wildflowers around them. They all come to land around his top half, making it appear that the remains are his. Thinking he is dead, Bugs begins to sob ("Gruesome, isn't it?", he briefly confides to the audience in a Jerry Colonna-like aside).  As he cries, his feet pop out of the ground; when Bugs can see them, then feels them, he laughs with relief and then suggests he knew all along that he was fine. As Bugs wanders along enjoying a carrot, Beaky leaps out and grabs him. After a struggle, the two start jitterbugging together. Bugs says, "Why don't we do this more often," to which Beaky replies, "Ya mean just what we're doing tonight?"  This is a quote of the first line of the song "Why Don't We Do This More Often?"  After a 'dip', Bugs releases Beaky into a spin; the buzzard twirls like a top over to the skeleton, spins into the earth and himself ends up in the same position Bugs was earlier. He screams "Oh, MA!" and his mother shows up. At first the mother buzzard thinks Bugs did something to Beaky. Bugs assures her 'the kid' is okay, and pulls Beaky out of the ground. Seeing that Beaky is unharmed, the mother abandons her desire to eat Bugs and declares him her hero and kisses him. A blushing Bugs copies Beaky's shyness and embarrassment.

Reception
Charles Carney, former Warner Bros. writer and editor, writes, "Clampett, one of the midwives of Bugs's deepening character, proceeds at his trademark breakneck speed... Bugs would go on to outwit a catalog of adversaries throughout the years, from the merely dumb to the diabolical. But his struggles with Killer... remain a classic of two memorable young characters in a comic battle for survival."

A contemporary review in The Film Daily said, "More hilarious adventures of Bugs Bunny are recorded herein to the complete satisfaction of young and old... This Technicolor cartoon is loaded with solid laughs."

Voice Cast
 Mel Blanc as Bugs Bunny and Young Buzzards
 Kent Rogers as Beaky Buzzard
 Sara Berner as Mama Buzzard

Home media
Bugs Bunny Gets the Boid was released on DVD in 2003 as part of Looney Tunes Golden Collection: Volume 1, the first Spotlight Collection and Looney Tunes Platinum Collection: Volume 2.

Having been theatrically released alongside the 1942 film Yankee Doodle Dandy, it has been also included on that DVD.

References

External links

 
 Extensive critical analysis of Bugs Bunny Gets the Boid

1942 films
1942 short films
1942 animated films
1940s animated short films
Films directed by Bob Clampett
Merrie Melodies short films
Films scored by Carl Stalling
Bugs Bunny films
Beaky Buzzard films
Films produced by Leon Schlesinger
1940s Warner Bros. animated short films
1940s English-language films